Nicoleta Dara (born Nicoleta Darabană, on 22 May 1993 in Telenești), commonly known as Dara, is a Moldovan pop singer. She is well known for singing in preselection for Moldova in the Eurovision Song Contest in March 2012, where she sang her single "Open Your Eyes". She released her album Unsorted in 2011. The album was not a success, unlike her two previous singles. In late 2012, her fourth official single titled "Chains" was released via YouTube.

Biography
Nicoleta Dara was born in 1993 in Moldova. She has been singing since she was three years old. At the age of 7, Dara auditioned for the Romanian song contest Ti Amo. In her teen years she recorded music with Anatol Roscovan. She attended the National College of Commerce and while there learned to play piano and guitar. She has been working with singer-songwriter Eugen Doibani, who produced her debut album Unsorted, since she was 17. Doibani and Roscovan wrote many of the songs on album, along with Dara. When she was 11, she also sang in Bulgaria.

Career

In 2010 Dara started to record her debut album. She worked along with Anatol Roscovan and Eugen Doibani. She had her first concert in 2010 in Moscow where she sang her two solo songs Camino and Mi-e dor, as well as a cover of Alanis Morissette's song Uninvited. She later released her first official single Open Your Eyes with an accompanying music video. The song was one of the Top 20 finalists but failed to win. Her song "Is it True" was also released. It featured on a well-known cat video on YouTube. "Is It True" has enjoyed moderate success and become Dara's most successful song. Her debut album, entitled "Unsorted" was released in 2011. The album was not commercially successful. In 2011 she also covered Duffy's hit Mercy. Dara is releasing her music independently. Her album was released under an unknown label.

In March 2012 Dara sang in Moldova in a bid to represent the country the Eurovision Song Contest. There, she sang her song "Open Your Eyes".

After an unsuccessful album, Dara is still promoting her music. She released one new promotional song "Seara de Craciun". In late 2012, she released her fourth official single, entitled "Chains".

Discography
 Unsorted (2011)

Awards

 2000: Zveozdicka
 2002: Rainbow stars
 2003: Steaua Elatului
 2004: Serebrenaia Yantra
 2004: Steaua Chisinaului
 2009: Otkritaya Evropa
 2009: Tahtede Laul
 2009: Suflet de stea
 2009: Barza de Cristal
 2009: Cerbul de aur junior
 2009: Ars Adolescentina
 2010: Zlaten Keste

References

External links
 YouTube official account

1993 births
21st-century Moldovan women singers
Living people
Women pop singers
People from Telenești District